Murakami ("village superior") is a Japanese surname, 35th by frequency in Japan. It can refer to:


People
Emperor Murakami, ancient Japanese emperor 
Daisuke Murakami (figure skater)
Daisuke Murakami (snowboarder)
Genzo Murakami (村上元三) (1910–2006),  novelist
Glen Murakami, animator
Hiroaki Murakami, actor
Haruki Murakami (村上春樹), (born 1949),  novelist
, Japanese jazz drummer
James J. Murakami, production designer & film Academy nominee
Jimmy Murakami (1933–2014) also known as Teruaki Murakami (村上輝明), animator and director 
Kanako Murakami (村上 佳菜子), figure skater
, Japanese poet
Les Murakami (born 1936), American college baseball coach
Maki Murakami, manga artist
, Japanese footballer
Masanori Murakami,   San Francisco Giants pitcher
Megumi Murakami, Japanese pop singer in Cute
, Japanese voice actress
Munetaka Murakami (村上 宗隆), Japanese baseball player
Nijiro Murakami, Japanese actor and voice actor
Ryu Murakami (村上龍), (fl. 21st cen.) writer and filmmaker
Shingo Murakami (村上信五), Japanese pop singer  in Kanjani Eight
Takeyoshi Murakami （村上武吉), Samurai
Takashi Murakami (村上隆),  artist and founder of  Superflat movement 
Takeshi Murakami (村上隆), English teacher & champion in game of Othello  (fl. 21st cen)
, Japanese footballer
Tetsuji Murakami, Karate pioneer in Europe
Yoshiaki Murakami (村上世彰), corporate raider and president of M&A Consulting
Mai Murakami, Japanese Artistic Gymnast

Fictional characters
 Gennosuke Murakami, from the Usagi Yojimbo comic book series
 Kyouji Murakami, from the Tokusatsu TV series, Kamen Rider 555
 Masaki Murakami, from the manga/anime series Guyver
 Murakami Harutomo, from the novel The Samurai's Tale by Erik Christian Haugaard
 Murakami Yagami, from the manga/anime series Blue Seed
 Murakami Natsumi, from the manga/anime series Negima! Magister Negi Magi
 Manzanar Murakami from Karen Tei Yamashita's novel "Tropic of Orange"
 Sho Murakami, from 2017 film Life

See also
 Murakami (disambiguation)

References

Japanese-language surnames